Centerview is a historic home located at Lynchburg, Virginia.  It is a two-story brick house completed in 1871 in the Greek Revival style. The dependency, which is similar in construction and detail to the main house but which may date to 1861, is a one-stay gabled brick building and originally served as a summer kitchen and cook's dwelling among other functions. The house and dependency were rehabilitated in 1999–2000 as law offices. Robert Withers Morgan and his family were long resident in the house; one of his six children was the painter Georgia Weston Morgan, who resided there until 1923.

It was listed on the National Register of Historic Places in 2000.

References

Houses on the National Register of Historic Places in Virginia
Houses completed in 1871
Greek Revival houses in Virginia
Houses in Lynchburg, Virginia
National Register of Historic Places in Lynchburg, Virginia
1871 establishments in Virginia